The Birkenhainer Straße (English: Birkenhainer road) is a long-distance hiking trail that follows an ancient trade route through the Mittelgebirge Spessart, in the states of Hesse and Bavaria, Germany. It is 71 km long and leads from Hanau to Gemünden am Main, cutting across the so-called Mainviereck, a large loop of the river Main. The trail follows an ancient trade route which in the Middle Ages was an important road for moving troops and for long-distance trade. The Birkenhainer Straße was a part of the link between Nuremberg and Antwerp. Its origins may lie back as far as the Neolithic period. The name likely derives from a prominent copse of birch trees that used to exist near the road at Geiselbach (Hesse).

History

Nearby findings and burial sites from the Neolithic and circular ramparts from the Iron Age indicate that the historic road Birkenhainer Straße or at least an assortment of its paths was used that long ago. In the Middle Ages, it was an important link between Eastern Franconia and the Rhine-Main region (Rhenish-Franconia). Past Hanau, the route crossed the river Main at Steinheim and continued along its southern bank to Mainz. It was used by travelling Emperors like Frederick Barbarossa on his way to the Imperial Diet at Würzburg, as well as by military forces. Back then, the Birkenhainer Straße also served as an important trade route between Nuremberg and Antwerp and was used for cattle drives. It was used by the renowned wagon drivers from Frammersbach, who dominated long-distance trade along several key routes.

The name Birkenhainer Straße likely derives from a copse of birch trees that stood near the village of Geiselbach, where several branches of the road meet to continue on together. The copse was referred to as Birkenhain in a document by the Abbey Seligenstadt dating from 1527.

Route

The old road began at the mouth of the Kinzig. The modern hiking trail mostly follows the historic route (which in some places was not just a single path but several alternative routes) and crosses the Spessart as a high route. It avoids the valleys and keeps to the peaks and ridges, as climbing up and down the slopes was difficult and arduous with horse- or ox-drawn wagons. At the same time, the route was much shorter than following the valley of the Main river in its great loop south to Wertheim and Miltenberg and back up to Aschaffenburg and Hanau.

The trail then leads through the outskirts of Geiselbach, the likely location of the birch copse that gave the road its name. At this point, several alternative routes met and continued onwards in a single direction. Heading north, the trail rejoins the Hessian–Bavarian border near Linsengericht and turns east again.

Looping around the valley of Lohrhaupten (Flörsbachtal), it rejoins the border and continues along it southwards before entering Bavaria for good near the Bayrische Schanz (sconce), an old border post. Past the Zollberg, named after a toll station between the territories of the Elector of Mainz and the Bishopric of Würzburg, the trail finally leads down into the Main valley at Langenprozelten and continues into Gemünden am Main where it terminates at the old town, east of the Franconian Saale.

Gallery

References

Further reading
 Geschichte & Geschichten entlang der Birkenhainer Straße. Von Hanau bis Gemünden (German). Published by the Main-Kinzig-Kreis, Gelnhausen 2010.

External links

Spessartbund 

Former trade routes
Medieval roads and tracks
Historic trails and roads in Germany
Hiking trails in Bavaria
Hiking trails in Hesse
Main-Spessart
Spessart
Aschaffenburg (district)